Scylla is a genus of swimming crabs, comprising four species, of which S. serrata is the most widespread. They are found across the Indo-West Pacific. The four species are:

References

Portunoidea
Decapod genera
Taxa named by Wilhem de Haan